Eloise Gómez Reyes (born January 27, 1956) is an American politician serving as the Majority Leader of the California State Assembly. She is a Democrat representing the 50th Assembly District, encompassing urban parts of southwestern San Bernardino County, including the cities of Rialto, Colton, and Fontana.  She was first elected to the Assembly by defeating fellow Democrat Cheryl Brown, who she claimed was not progressive enough.

Prior to her election to the Assembly, she was an attorney. In 2014, Reyes ran unsuccessfully for the United States House of Representatives in the 31st Congressional District, coming in fourth place in the June primary.

References

External links 
 
 Campaign website
 Join California Eloise Reyes

1956 births
21st-century American politicians
21st-century American women politicians
Living people
Hispanic and Latino American state legislators in California
Hispanic and Latino American women in politics
Loyola Law School alumni
Democratic Party members of the California State Assembly
People from Colton, California
People from San Bernardino County, California
University of Southern California alumni
Women state legislators in California